{{Automatic taxobox
| taxon = Cassidae
| image = Semicassis pyrum (top).JPG
| image_caption = Lateral view of a shell of Semicassis pyrum
| authority = Latreille, 1825 
| synonyms_ref = 
| synonyms = 
 Cassididae Gyllenhal, 1813
 Oocorythidae P. Fischer, 1885
| type_genus =  
| subdivision_ranks = Genera
| subdivision = See text
}}

The Cassidae are a taxonomic family of medium-sized, large, and sometimes very large sea snails commonly called helmet snails or bonnet snails. These are marine gastropod mollusks in the superfamily Tonnoidea and the clade Littorinimorpha.

About 60 species comprise the family Cassidae; an example is Cypraecassis rufa.

Nomenclature
Despite its incorrect formation (the correct one would be Cassididae, based on the genitive form of Cassis), the ICZN has placed the name Cassidae Latreille, 1825 on the official list of family names, therefore avoiding homonymy with Cassididae Stephens, 1831 (based on Cassida Linnaeus, 1758, a chrysomelid beetle); Opinion 1023 (1974, Bulletin of Zoological Nomenclature 31: 127-129).

Distribution
Species of this family occur in tropical and temperate seas from the intertidal zone to depths of 100 m (330 ft), buried in the sand during the day and becoming active at night.

Shell description
Members of this family are shaped rather like bonnets or helmets, as their common name suggests. The shells are large, thick, subglobular with dextrally coiled, sometimes varicose, whorls, and a short spire. The coiling may be trochospiral or convoluted. The shells of many species have great variability, which has led to many misidentifications, resulting in many synonyms.

Many species have a large and solid shield over the parietal body or beside the thick, plicated columella. Many species show blunt knobs and thickened axial ridges, known as varices. The thin, horny operculum is oval in shape and covers a long aperture. The siphonal canal is straight or slightly curved. The outer lip is somewhat thicker at its margin and toothed on the inside.

 Anatomy 
These snails have a large mantle and a large, muscular foot. Their large head has an extensible snout. The eyes are at the base of the single pair of tentacles.

Feeding habits
Helmet bonnets prey on echinoderms (especially sea urchins), starting by gripping them using the foot. The snail then makes a hole in the urchin through the combined action of a secretion which is rich in sulfuric acid and by rasping with their radula. The acid secretion is provided by two large proboscis glands.

Taxonomy
In their taxonomy of the Gastropoda of 2005 Bouchet & Rocroi still listed Cassidae as Cassinae Latreille, 1825, a  subfamily of Tonnidae Suter, 1913 (1825), following in this Riedel (1995). In his "Revision of the deep-water Cassidae" however, Beu raised in 2008 Cassinae to the rank of family.

Genera 
Genera within the family include:Casmaria H. Adams and A. Adams, 1853Cassis Scopoli, 1777Cypraecassis Stutchbury, 1837Dalium  Dall, 1889 Echinophoria Sacco, 1890Eucorys Beu, 2008Galeodea Link, 1807Microsconsia Beu, 2008Oocorys P. Fischer, 1883Phalium Link, 1807  - bonnet shellsSconsia Gray, 1847Semicassis Mörch, 1852

Genera brought into synonymy 
 Bathygalea Woodring & Olsson, 1957: synonym of  Echinophoria Sacco, 1890
 Benthodolium Verrill & Smith [in Verrill], 1884: synonym of Oocorys P. Fischer, 1884
 Bezoardica Schumacher, 1817: synonym of Phalium Link, 1807
 Bezoardicella Habe, 1961: synonym of Phalium Link, 1807
 Cassidaria Lamarck, 1816: synonym of Galeodea Link, 1807
 Cassidea Bruguière, 1789: synonym of Cassis Scopoli, 1777
 Echinora Schumacher, 1817: synonym of Galeodea Link, 1807
 Euspinacassis Finlay, 1926: synonym of Echinophoria Sacco, 1890
 Galeoocorys Kuroda & Habe, 1957: synonym of Galeodea Link, 1807
 Hadroocorys Quinn, 1980: synonym of Oocorys P. Fischer, 1884
 Morio Montfort, 1810: synonym of Galeodea Link, 1807
 Taieria Finlay & Marwick, 1937: synonym of Galeodea Link, 1807
 † Trachydolium Howe, 1926: synonym of Echinophoria Sacco, 1890
 Xenogalea Iredale, 1927: synonym of Semicassis Mörch, 1852
 Xenophalium Iredale, 1927: synonym of Semicassis Mörch, 1852

 Human uses 
Some helmet shells are carved into cameos, starting in Italy in 1820.
The king helmet Cassis tuberosa was the first species to be made into cameos.
 The black helmet Cassis madagascariensis, also known as Cassis cameo, has a dark brown or a claret-coloured shell layer under a yellowish outer layer.  This gives it an onyx appearance and makes it one of the most useful shells for cameos.
 The red helmet Cypraecassis rufa gives a sardonyx-like appearance because it has sard-coloured bands under its pale outer coating.
 The horned helmet Cassis cornuta produces a white figure on an orange background. It is also used as a trumpet by native Filipinos.

References

 Abbott, R.T. (1968). The Helmet Shells of the World (Cassidae) Part 1. Indo-Pacific Mollusca 2(9): 7-201
 Riedel F. 1995. An outline of Cassoidean phylogeny (Mollusca, Gastropoda). Contributions to Tertiary and Quaternary Geology 32(4): 97–132
 Kreipl K. 1997. Recent Cassidae. Christa Hemmen, Wiesbaden, 151 p
 Beu A.G. (2008) Recent Deep-water Cassidae of the World. A revision of Galeodea, Oocorys, Sconsia, Echinophoria and related taxa, with new genera and species (Mollusca, Gastropoda). In Héros V., Cowie R.H. & Bouchet P. (eds), Tropical Deep-Sea Benthos 25. Mémoires du Muséum National d'Histoire Naturelle 196: 269-387.

External links
 https://www.biolib.cz/en/taxon/id24557/ accessed 5 December 2017
 Checklist of Mollusca
 ITIS
 Steyn, D.G. & Lussi, M. 2005. Offshore Shells of Southern Africa'' 
 http://www.gastropods.com/Taxon_pages/Family_CASSIDAE.shtml#CASSIDAECASSINAE